Kitaura Station is the name of two train stations in Japan.

Kitaura Station (Miyagi), in Miyagi Prefecture on the East Rikuu Line.
Kitaura Station (Kōchi), in Kōchi Prefecture on the Tosa Dentetsu Gomen Line